Cava (stylized as CAVA) and also referred to as Cava Grill, is a privately held Mediterranean fast casual restaurant chain with locations across the United States. Cava is owned by Cava Group, which also owns Zoës Kitchen. The combined company is the largest restaurant operator in the Mediterranean category in the U.S. restaurant industry. Cava also produces a line of Mediterranean dips, spreads, and dressings that are sold in grocery stores across the US.

History 

In 2006, first-generation Greek Americans Ted Xenohristos, Ike Grigoropoulos, and Dimitri Moshovitis launched the full-service Cava Mezze restaurant in Rockville, Maryland, with Moshovitis as executive chef. Following the launch of four additional restaurants, in 2008, Xenohristos, Grigoropoulos, and Moshovitis launched a line of dips and spreads to over 200 stores, including Whole Foods Market. In 2009, Brett Schulman joined them as CEO and co-founder of the fast-casual chain Cava (originally called Cava Mezze Grill, later rebranded as Cava Grill and then simply as Cava). They opened the first Cava restaurant in Bethesda, Maryland, in January 2011.

In April 2021, Cava Group completed a $190 million series F funding round led by T. Rowe Price, bringing its value to nearly $1.3 billion. Since 2015, the company has raised more than $640 million.

Cava was named one of the world's 50 most innovative companies by Fast Company in 2018. Fishbowl Analytics named Cava Grill its top emerging restaurant brand in 2019. Since 2018, Cava has been offering its employees paid time off to vote. In the 2020 presidential election, Cava offered free meals to poll workers in all of its locations. During the Covid-19 pandemic, Cava launched a program called Feeding Families where, for every family meal sold, they donated another to the family of a first responder. Cava has since removed the family meal option from their menu.

Restaurants and expansion 

In November 2018, Cava Group bought Zoës Kitchen, a restaurant chain with more than 250 locations, in a deal worth $300 million, taking the company private and helping Cava expand further into the suburbs.

As of August 2021, there are 133 Cava locations. Each one of Cava's restaurants is company owned, and none are franchised. In 2020, Cava Group converted seven of its Zoës Kitchen locations to Cava-branded restaurants, and plan to convert 50 more in 2021. Cava has also invested in new technologies to expand its tech platform. It has additional off-premises and digital kitchens dedicated to preparing food for online orders. Cava added curbside pickup to its locations, added delivery through its mobile app and website, and delivery through DoorDash and Uber Eats.

In November 2021, Cava closed its outpost in Barracks Row in Washington, DC., which was the second location it had opened in 2009, in order to "concentrate on our new concepts and other locations.”

Cava Group

History
Cava Group, Inc., the parent of Cava and Zoës Kitchen, was formed by Brett Schulman in 2011. Cava Group was named one of the world's 50 most innovative companies by Fast Company in 2018. Fishbowl Analytics named Cava Grill its top emerging restaurant brand in 2019. Since 2018, Cava has been offering its employees paid time off to vote. In the 2020 presidential election, Cava offered free meals to poll workers in all of its locations. During the Covid-19 pandemic, Cava launched a program called Feeding Families where, for every family meal sold, they donated another to the family of a first responder.

References 

Privately held companies based in Washington, D.C.
Restaurants in the United States
Restaurants established in 2011
Mediterranean restaurants
Greek restaurants
Fast casual restaurants
Restaurant chains in the United States
Hummus
Dips (food)
Spreads (food)
American companies established in 2011
2011 establishments in Maryland